The  Little League World Series took place between August 20 and August 24 in Williamsport, Pennsylvania. The Wakayama Little League of Osaka, Japan, defeated the Tuckahoe Little League of Richmond, Virginia, in the championship game of the 22nd Little League World Series.

Teams

Championship bracket

Consolation bracket

Notable players
 Jim Pankovits of Richmond went on to play in MLB as an infielder between 1984 and 1990
 Turk Schonert of Garden Grove went on to play in the NFL as a quarterback between 1981 and 1989

External links
1968 Little League World Series
Line scores for the 1968 LLWS

Little League World Series
Little League World Series
Little League World Series